Ryuji Koizumi (born 17 September 1952) is a Japanese politician. He served as a member of the House of Representatives of Japan since 2000.

References 

1952 births
Living people
Place of birth missing (living people)
Members of the House of Representatives (Japan)
Independent politicians
Liberal Democratic Party (Japan) politicians
21st-century Japanese politicians